Pterioidea is a superfamily of epifaunal marine bivalves mostly inhabiting continental shelf regions of tropical and subtropical oceans. The superfamily includes the economically-important saltwater pearl oysters as well as the oddly shaped hammer oysters (neither of which, however, is considered a true oyster). A number of species have found use as model organisms in the fields of medicine and science.

It includes the following three accepted living families:
Malleidae, the hammer oysters, Lamarck, 1818
Pteriidae, the pearl oysters, tree oysters, and winged oysters, Gray, 1847 (1820)
Pulvinitidae, a family of rare deep sea oysters, no common name, Stephenson, 1941

Fossil families include:
Family †Aviculopectinidae
Family †Bakevelliidae
Family †Cassianellidae
Family †Isognomonidae
Family †Kochiidae
Family †Pergamidiidae
Family †Plicatosylidae
Family †Posidoniidae
Family †Pterineidae
Family †Retroceramidae

References

Pteriida
Mollusc superfamilies